Cora hymenocarpa is a species of basidiolichen in the family Hygrophoraceae. Found in Costa Rica, it was formally described as a new species in 2016 by Robert Lücking, José Luis Chaves, and James D. Lawrey. The specific epithet hymenocarpa refers to the "strongly flattened, emarginate hymenophore". Cora hymenocarpa grows in the tropical rainforests of Costa Rica as an epiphyte on the somewhat shaded branches and twigs of shrubs and trees. The Colombian species Cora hafecesweorthensis is similar in appearance but is not closely related phylogenetically.

References

hymenocarpa
Lichen species
Lichens described in 2016
Lichens of Central America
Taxa named by James D. Lawrey
Taxa named by Robert Lücking
Basidiolichens